Gilles Marc Béhat (3 September 1949) is a French filmmaker and actor.

Biography 
Gilles Béhat (Béat by birth) was born in Lille. The confusion around the "h" in his last name stems from an error in the credits of the first film he participated in as an actor: L'Hercule sur la place.

As a teenager, he played guitar with a rock band. He attended the Conservatoire d'Art Dramatique, taking acting classes.

He launching his career as an actor by taking roles in television series such as that of Pierre Vignard in L'Hercule sur la place and Charles IV le Bel in Les Rois maudits (1972) as well as in the cinema in films like Gérard Pires's 1970 film Elle court, elle court la banlieue, Jean Yanne's 1972 film Chobizenesse and Bernard Paul's 1975 film Beau Masque.

As a director, he made a series of feature films, including many detective and action films. He gained attention after the released of his 1984 gangster film Rue barbare. Several of his subsequent films, including Dancing Machine starring Alain Delon, were relative commercial failures. He then turned to television, where he directed series for TF1, France 2 and Canal+ in the 1990s.

In 2008, he returned to cinema, directing Diamant 13; a noir starring Gérard Depisodeardieu, Olivier Marchal and Asia Argento.

Filmography

Cinema

As actor 

 1970 : L'Hercule sur la place (as Pierre Vignaud)
 1970:  Elle court, elle court la banlieue
 1973:  Les valets clos
 1975:  Les Noces de Porcelaine
 1975:  Beau Masque
 1976 : Le Tigre du ciel

As director 

 1973:  Demain Matin (short, also actor)
 1974:  La Couleur de la Mer (short)
 1978 : Haro!
 1981 : Putain d'histoire d'amour
 1984 : Rue barbare
 1985 : Urgence
 1986 : Charlie Dingo
 1986 : Les Longs Manteaux
 1988 : Le Manteau de Saint-Martin
 1990 : Dancing Machine
 1991 : Le Vent de la Toussaint
 1994 : Le Cavalier des nuages
 2009 : Diamant 13

Television

As actor 

 1971 : La Dame de Montsoreau (as Epernon)
 1972 : Les Boussardel
 1972 : Les Rois maudits, de Claude Barma (as Charles IV le Bel)
 1972 : Les Enquêtes du commissaire Maigret : Maigret en meublé (as Van Damme)
 1974 : La Cloche tibétaine (as Victor Point)
 1977 : Un juge, un flic: (episode: Flambant neuf)

As director 

 1995 : L'Auberge de la Jamaïque
 1996 : Les Cordier, juge et flic (episode: Le petit juge)
 1996 : Les Cordier, juge et flic (episode: La mémoire blessée)
 1997 : Les Cordier, juge et flic (episode: Boulot de flic)
 1997 : Les Cordier, juge et flic (episode: Le petit frère)
 1997 : Julie Lescaut (episode: Interdit au public)
 1997 : Un enfant au soleil 
 1998 : Julie Lescaut (episode: Bal masqué)
 1999 : Une femme d'honneur (episode: Bébés volés)
 2000 : Une mère en colère 
 2001 : Les Cordier, juge et flic (episode: Saut périlleux)
 2002 : Les Cordier, juge et flic (episode: Otages)
 2003 : Les Cordier, juge et flic (episode: Adieu mulet)
 2004 : Les Cordier, juge et flic (episode: Faux départ)
 2004 : Père et Maire (episode: Entre père et mère)
 2005:  Père et Maire (episode: Les liens du cœur)
 2006:  Père et Maire (episode: Retour de flammes)
 2004 : Alex Santana, négociateur
 2007 : Paris, enquêtes criminelles (episodes: Requiem pour un assassin, Fantome, Le Serment, Scalpel)
 2007: Commissaire Cordier (episode: Redemption)
 2008: R.I.S. Police scientifique (episodes: Jugement dernier, Eaux profondes)

External links

References 

French filmmakers
French directors
French actors
Mass media people from Lille
1949 births
Living people